The Brighton tornado is the strongest storm recorded in Melbourne to date.

On the afternoon of 2 February 1918, with prevailing north-westerly winds and a heat wave (typical conditions for Melbourne thunderstorms). After a severe storm formed and moved off Port Phillip, two tornadoes struck Brighton beach simultaneously at approximately 5:45 pm and proceeded inland, converging near the junction of Halifax and Church Streets. Five minutes later, a third tornado struck. The tornadoes then tracked east over open fields.

Damage retrospectively rated F3 on the Fujita scale was observed in places. Two people were killed, a man and a boy, while the drowning of a woman at St Kilda beach is believed to be related to the same storm cell.  Over 6 were injured in the Brighton area.

The tornado completely destroyed the Hawthorn Road Methodist church, which was later rebuilt.  Numerous homes were demolished. The tornado badly damaged the Brighton Baths, tore the roof off Royal Terminus Hotel and destroyed the verandah of Grimley's Hotel.  Extensive damage was incurred to infrastructure on the Sandringham railway line.  Several community and sporting facilities were destroyed including the cricket club grandstand and a bandstand.  It also damaged the burial monument of Adam Lindsay Gordon in the Brighton general cemetery.

See also 
 Extreme weather events in Melbourne
List of tornadoes and tornado outbreaks
List of Southern Hemisphere tornadoes and tornado outbreaks

References

1918 in Australia
History of Melbourne
Tornadoes in Australia
Tornadoes of 1918
February 1918 events